Brayan Ramírez (born 16 June 1994) is a Honduran footballer. He represented Honduras in the football competition at the 2016 Summer Olympics.

References

Honduran footballers
1994 births
Living people
Juticalpa F.C. players
Liga Nacional de Fútbol Profesional de Honduras players
Footballers at the 2016 Summer Olympics
Olympic footballers of Honduras
Association football defenders